Ne quid nimis is Latin for "nothing in excess".

It is a behavioral norm that is found in the Andria (comedy) (v. 61) by Terence. It is a translation of the Greek μηδὲν άγαν inscribed on the temple of Apollo in Delphi.

See also
 Delphic maxims
 List of Latin phrases

References

Latin words and phrases
Latin mottos
Horace